Copa de la Reina de Voleibol is the second most important competition of female volleyball in Spain. Inaugural edition was played in 1976. It's hosted by Real Federación Española de Voleibol.

Top six teams at half-season in Superliga Femenina play the Copa de la Reina, being played generally on February.

Winners by year

Wins by teams

See also
Superliga Femenina de Voleibol
Supercopa de España de Voleibol Femenino

References

External links
Royal Spanish Volleyball Federation